The 2007–08 Miami Heat season was their 20th season in the National Basketball Association. To commemorate the anniversary, the Heat jerseys bear a XX on the rightmost part. However, the season turned out to be disastrous. The Heat never recovered from winning only eight games in the first two months of the season and finished 15–67, the worst record in the league. Coincidentally, this was the same record the team posted in their inaugural season.

This was Pat Riley's final season as head coach of the Heat and his twenty–six year NBA coaching career was ended before officially resigned for a second time following the season. He did, however, remain as team president and replaced by Riley's assistant coach Erik Spoelstra.

It was also Alonzo Mourning's final season in the NBA as he suffered a season-ending and a possibly career-ending knee injury in a December game in Atlanta. After sitting out half of next season, Mourning retired in January. After his retirement, Mourning stayed with the Heat as an executive.

At mid-season in February, Shaquille O'Neal was traded to the Phoenix Suns for Shawn Marion and Marcus Banks. Before the trade, the Heat acquired Penny Hardaway, who was O'Neal's teammate with the Orlando Magic from 1993 until 1996. This move reunited the duo. However, Hardaway was waived after a few games with the team and he would never play in the NBA again and officially announced his retirement from basketball after 16 seasons.

Dwyane Wade, after recovering from off-season shoulder and knee surgeries, battled knee injuries and missed the final 21 games of the season after undergoing OssaTron treatment on his left knee. Wade recovered in time to play in the 2008 Summer Olympics.

Key dates
Key dates prior to the start of the season:
 The 2007 NBA draft took place in New York City on June 28.
 The free agency period began in July.

Offseason

Draft picks
Miami's selections from the 2007 NBA draft in New York City.

Roster

Standings

Record vs. opponents

Game log

November
Record: 4–11 ; Home: 2–6 ; Road: 2–5

December
Record: 4–12 ; Home: 2–4 ; Road: 2–8

January
Record: 1–13 ; Home: 1–7 ; Road: 0–6

February
Record: 2–10 ; Home: 1–5 ; Road: 1–5

March
Record: 2–15 ; Home: 1–7 ; Road: 1–8

April
Record: 2–6 ; Home: 2–3 ; Road: 0–3

 Green background indicates win.
 Red background indicates loss.

Player stats

Regular season

*Total for entire season including previous team(s)

Awards and records

Records

Milestones

Transactions
The Heat have been involved in the following transactions during the 2007–08 season.

Trades

Subtractions
Marcus Slaughter-Power Forward/Center, signed a two-year contract with Miami in June 2007, but was released October 29, 2007.

Free agents

See also
 2007–08 NBA season

References

Miami Heat seasons
2007–08 NBA season by team
Miami Heat
Miami Heat